The 2019 Southeast Asian Games men's softball tournament was held at the Clark International Sports Complex at The Villages, in Pampanga from 2 to 8 December 2019.

Results

Preliminary round

Final round

Page play-offs

Page 1–2

Page 3–4

Semi-final

Final

See also
Women's tournament

References

External links
  

Men's tournament